James Guilford Swinnerton (13 November 1875 – 8 September 1974) was an American cartoonist and a landscape painter of the Southwest deserts. He was known as Jimmy to some and Swinny to others. He signed some of his early cartoons Swin, and on one ephemeral comic strip he used Guilford as his signature. Experimenting with narrative continuity, he played a key role in developing the comic strip at the end of the 19th century.

Cartoons
Jimmy Swinnerton's birthplace is a matter of dispute, with one gallery-owner giving Eureka, California, and another writing,

The son of Judge J. W. Swinnerton, Jimmy was 14 when he entered the San Francisco School of Design, where the painter Emil Carlsen was one of his instructors. He was still a teenager when he became a staff cartoonist for Hearst's San Francisco Examiner in 1892. One of his first assignments was to produce for the children's section of the newspaper a weekly cartoon, successively titled California Bears, The Little Bears and Little Bears and Tykes. Comic art historians like Robert Greenberger have called the Little Bears the first comic strip,  preceding The Yellow Kid by three years. This assertion is debatable, depending on the definition of comic strip, but Swinnerton was certainly drawing multi-panel stories with speech balloons by 1900.

In 1896, he moved to New York by invitation to produce comic strips for the Journal-American, another Hearst paper. He drew a few more Little Bears for the paper, followed by some strips with a Noah's Ark setting, referred to as Mount Ararat. He hit upon a durable theme with a series of strips featuring anthropomorphic tigers, which soon took the title Mr. Jack. As the character developed, Mr. Jack was an inveterate philanderer, to his wife's distress. Some of his misdeeds were considered unsuitable for juvenile readers. The strip had its last appearance in the Sunday comics color supplement in 1904. In a later revival (1912–19), it appeared in the editorial pages. Meanwhile, Swinnerton continued to fill his Sunday space with a new character, a scatterbrained boy named Jimmy. He drew Jimmy in various formats, eventually under the title Little Jimmy, until 1958 (with a hiatus from 1941 to 1945, during which he wrote and drew the King Features Syndicate Western strip Rocky Mason, Government Marshal, which premiered on Sunday, August 24, 1941). A peculiarity of Swinnerton's comic strips is that the dialogue appears in quotes within the speech balloons.

Arizona and the desert
About 1906, a doctor told Swinnerton that he was suffering from tuberculosis and had two weeks to live. Determined to defeat the prognosis, Swinnerton was put on a train to Colton, California, by William Randolph Hearst, who considered Swinnerton one of his favorite employees. Swinnerton recovered and stayed there. He alternated between residences in Arizona and California for most of his life. In 1941, he was living at 1261 North Laurel Avenue in Los Angeles.

The spectacular Arizona desert landscape began to influence Swinnerton's artistic output. From 1922 to 1941, he produced a series of picture stories titled Canyon Kiddies for Hearst's Good Housekeeping. The Canyon Kiddies stories usually consisted of several lush color illustrations with captions in verse.

Swinnerton joined the Bohemian Club, rose through the ranks, and was elected president in 1929. He was also a member of the California Art Club and the Academy of Western Painters. In 1940, he painted 50 backgrounds for Warner Bros. and Leon Schlesinger Productions for a Chuck Jones Merrie Melodies cartoon featuring the Canyon Kiddies, titled Mighty Hunters.

Landscape paintings

Art appraiser and curator Alissa J. Anderson described Swinnerton's work as a painter after he moved to the Southwest:

He painted desert scenes as a fine artist from about 1920 to 1965. In later years he had a studio in the Coachella Valley near Palm Springs, and the locally published Desert Magazine expanded his renown. He also maintained a home in Palo Alto, California.

Death and legacy 
Jimmy Swinnerton died in Palm Springs, California, at the age of 98.

A natural arch in Monument Valley, Arizona, was named "Swinnerton Arch" in his honor.

See also
 Carl Eytel
 Edmund C. Jaeger

References

Further reading

External links
 
 The Ohio State University Billy Ireland Cartoon Library & Museum: Jimmy Swinnerton

Audio
 

1875 births
1974 deaths
American comic strip cartoonists
American landscape painters
Artists from Palm Springs, California
San Francisco Art Institute alumni
Painters from California
20th-century American painters
American male painters
20th-century American male artists